Gao Yulan (born 3 October 1982 in Ruichang, Jiujiang, Jiangxi) is a female Chinese rower, who won silver medal in the Women's double sculls at the 2008 Summer Olympics. Her race partner was Wu You.

At the 2012 Summer Olympics, she and partner Zhang Yage did not qualify for the final.

Records
2008 World Cup Lucerne – 1st W2-

References

1982 births
Living people
Olympic rowers of China
Olympic silver medalists for China
People from Jiujiang
Rowers at the 2008 Summer Olympics
Rowers at the 2012 Summer Olympics
Olympic medalists in rowing
Chinese female rowers
Rowers from Jiangxi
Medalists at the 2008 Summer Olympics
20th-century Chinese women
21st-century Chinese women